The women's team table tennis event was part of the table tennis programme and took place between 25 and 27 May, at the Waseda University Gymnasium.

Schedule
All times are Japan Standard Time (UTC+09:00)

Results

Non-participating athletes

References

 Official Report

External links
ITTF Database

Table tennis at the 1958 Asian Games